Solidago canadensis, known as Canada goldenrod or Canadian goldenrod, is an herbaceous perennial plant of the family Asteraceae. It is native to northeastern and north-central North America and often forms colonies of upright growing plants, with many small yellow flowers in a branching inflorescence held above the foliage. It is an invasive plant in other parts of the continent and several areas worldwide, including Europe and Asia. It is grown as an ornamental in flower gardens.

Description
Solidago canadensis is a herbaceous perennial plant with stems that grow 2-4 feet and sometimes to 6 feet (30–150(–200) cm) tall. It has a wide distribution with several varieties, which have significant variability. The lanceolate to broadly linear shaped leaves are alternately arranged on the stems. The leaves are 4-6" long and 1" wide. The stems have lines of white hairs, while the undersides of the leaves are pubescent. The leaves are often prominently toothed. The flowers have yellow rays and are arranged into small heads on branched pyramidal shaped inflorescences, flowering occurs from July to October.  It has a rhizomatous growth habit, which can produce large colonies of clones. This goldenrod can be found growing on distributed sites, along dry road sides to moist thickets.

Ecology and distribution
Solidago canadensis is sometimes browsed by deer and is good to fair as food for domestic livestock such as cattle or horses.

It is found in a variety of habitats. It typically is one of the first plants to colonize an area after a disturbance (such as fire) and rarely persists once shrubs and trees become established. It is found in very dry locations and also waterlogged ones.

Canada goldenrod is visited by a wide variety of insects for its pollen and nectar, including bees, wasps, flies, beetles, butterflies, and moths. It is especially strongly favored as a nectar source by bumblebees and paper wasps, such as Polistes parametricus and Polistes fuscatus. Aside from wasps, it is also visited frequently by honeybees and some butterflies, such as monarchs. 

It can be extremely aggressive and tends to form monocultures and near-monocultures in parts of its native range, such as in Southwest Ohio clay loam. It not only seeds a great deal, but also spreads rapidly via running rhizomes. Its root system is very tough, and plants that have been pulled out of the ground prior to freezing and left exposed atop soil have survived winter temperatures down to -26 °C (-14 °F).

Solidago canadensis is winter hardy in USDA hardiness zones 3-9.

Many wasps form parasitic galls inside the stem of goldenrod. There are stem, flower, and bud galls

Invasive species

It is established as an invasive weed in many parts of Europe, Japan and China.

In eastern and southeastern China, particularly the provinces of Zhejiang, Jiangsu, Jiangxi and Shanghai, its invasion has caused widespread concern. Local news reported that the spread of invasive plants including Canada goldenrod has caused the extinction of 30 native plants in Shanghai, as of 2004. According to the CCTV program Jiaodian Fangtan, it has reduced orange harvests in Ningbo. It is still spreading across China, and sightings have been reported in as far as Yunnan province. Eradication attempts are still underway as of 2021. Confusion with native Solidago species is a concern.

References

External links

 Jepson Manual Treatment: Solidago canadensis
 United States Geological Survey: Solidago canadensis
 Profile: Canada Goldenrod (Solidago canadensis) Photos, Drawings, Text. (Wild Plants of Winnipeg from Nature Manitoba)

canadensis
Flora of North America
Plants described in 1753
Taxa named by Carl Linnaeus